Kiril Milenov Milov (27 January 1997) is a Bulgarian Greco-Roman wrestler. He is a two-time silver medalist in the men's 97kg event at the World Wrestling Championships (2018 and 2022). He represented Bulgaria at the 2020 Summer Olympics in Tokyo, Japan.

Career 

At the 2014 Summer Youth Olympics held in Nanjing, China, he won the silver medal in the 85 kg event.

He won the silver medal in the 97 kg event at the 2018 World Wrestling Championships held in Budapest, Hungary. In 2019, he won the silver medal in the 97 kg event at the European Wrestling Championships held in Bucharest, Romania. In the final, he lost against Musa Evloev of Russia.

In March 2021, he qualified at the European Qualification Tournament to compete at the 2020 Summer Olympics in Tokyo, Japan. In April 2021, he competed in the 97 kg event at the European Wrestling Championships held in Warsaw, Poland.

He competed in the 97 kg event at the 2020 Summer Olympics held in Tokyo, Japan. He won his first match against Cenk İldem of Turkey and he was then eliminated in his next match by eventual bronze medalist Mohammad Hadi Saravi of Iran.

He won the gold medal in the 97 kg event at the 2022 European Wrestling Championships held in Budapest, Hungary. In the final, he defeated Arvi Savolainen of Finland. He won the silver medal in the 97kg event at the 2022 World Wrestling Championships held in Belgrade, Serbia.

Milov is a fan of extreme sports.

Achievements

References

External links 

 

Living people
1997 births
People from Dupnitsa
Bulgarian male sport wrestlers
World Wrestling Championships medalists
Wrestlers at the 2014 Summer Youth Olympics
European Wrestling Championships medalists
Wrestlers at the 2020 Summer Olympics
Olympic wrestlers of Bulgaria
European Wrestling Champions
Sportspeople from Kyustendil Province
21st-century Bulgarian people